Senegal have played in sixteen editions of the Africa Cup of Nations.

Historically, Senegal was seen as a weaker side in the strong West African region. Although they finished in fourth place in two AFCON editions, Senegalese performance was overall still deemed as poor. Senegal remained under the shadow of much more successful West African giants Nigeria, Ivory Coast and Ghana for the majority of the 20th century.

In the 2000s, Senegal began to surge and became a more competitive opponent in the Africa Cup of Nations. Following a successful FIFA World Cup debut in 2002, in which the side reached the quarter-finals, Senegal officially established itself as a new powerhouse in Africa. The 2002 Africa Cup of Nations tournament marked the best ever result in Senegalese football history, with the team falling to Cameroon 2–3 on penalties after a goalless draw in the final. Senegal once again finished as runners-up in 2019, losing the final 0–1 to Algeria. The nation finally won their first AFCON title in 2021, defeating Egypt on penalties in the final.

Overall record

Matches

Squads

References

External links
Africa Cup of Nations - Archives competitions - cafonline.com

Senegal national football team
Countries at the Africa Cup of Nations